Palnati Surya Pratap (born 13 January 1978) is an Indian film director and screenwriter who predominantly works in Telugu cinema. Pratap made his directorial debut with Current (2009) and later directed Kumari 21F (2015).

Early and personal life 
After his graduation, Pratap worked with All India Radio for over an year. To pursue a career in film making, he discontinued his post-graduation and started as an Assistant Director for Suresh Productions.

Career 
Pratap worked under director Sukumar as screenwriter for a couple of films. He later went on to direct Current (2009). 

His next directorial, produced by Sukumar Writings and written by Sukumar, was Kumari 21F. The film released in 2015. A. Harini Prasad of The New Indian Express opined, "The film directed by Palnati Surya Pratap, fails to reach the standards of Sukumar’s previously written stories."

Filmography

References

External links

1978 births
Living people
Telugu film directors
Telugu screenwriters
Film directors from Telangana
Screenwriters from Telangana
People from Bhadradri Kothagudem district